Poovellam Un Vaasam is a 2001 Indian Tamil-language drama film written and directed by Ezhil and produced by V. Ravichandran. It stars Ajith Kumar and Jyothika as childhood friends, alongside an ensemble supporting cast of Nagesh, Sivakumar, Sayaji Shinde, Vivek, Yugendran, and Kovai Sarala. The film was released on 17 August 2001. It received positive reviews and became a commercial success.

Plot 
Two families stay in identical bungalows, adjacent to each other, tracing their friendship to over 40 years. Their respective progenies Chinna and Chella are childhood friends, their easy camaraderie and strong bonding carried over to their adult years. The two of them study in the same college, same class, zoom together on the motorbike, their togetherness at home and college, as accepted a fact as it was in films like Piriyadha Varam Vendum (2001). Somewhere along the way, the duo falls in love, throwing some soft glances at each other when the other is not looking.

Their college mate Karna, makes devious plans to separate the duo and make Chella his. He does not seem to have any running feud with Chinna, is quite friendly with the duo, and does not seem to be particularly in love with Chella. Chinna laps up all that Karna tells him about Chella loving him, and is heartbroken and goes out on a business trip. Chella, persuaded by both families to marry a NRI, boldly informs them that she loved Chinna and would marry him. The two families are happy.

Chinna returns home and learns of the preparation for his engagement ceremony. Feeling that since Chella loved Karna, it must be family pressure that must have forced her to agree. Chinna then backs out. It is Chella's turn to be indignant about Chinna's mistrust of her love, and after giving him a piece of her mind, she backs out, with Chinna pleading for acceptance. After a period of separation, during which all ties between the two families are severed, both soon come to realize that they cannot live without their dearest friends and lovers. The two families then reunite.

Cast 

 Ajith Kumar as Chinna
 Jyothika as Chella (Voice dubbed by Savitha Reddy)
 Sivakumar as Arunachalam, Chinna's father
 Janaki Sabesh as Janaki, Chinna's mother
 Nagesh as Murugesan, Chinna's grandfather
 Sayaji Shinde as Rajasekar, as Chella's father
 Jaya Murali as Narmada, Chella's mother
 V. S. Raghavan as Chinnasamy, Chella's grandfather
 Sukumari as Chella's grandmother
 Vivek as Varathan
 Yugendran as Karna
 Kovai Sarala as Kanniga
 Vaiyapuri as Durai
 Sona Heiden as Anitha
 Madhan Bob as Chella's family friend
 S. N. Lakshmi as Durai's grandmother
 Swaminathan as Saamy, cook
 Ilavarasu as Pandi, laundry owner
 Lollu Sabha Uday as a guest at Anitha's wedding
 Mayilswamy as a guest at Anitha's wedding
 Lavanya as Chinna's sister
 Prabhakaran Chandran "Prabhu" as Diwakar "Diwa", Chella's brother
 Mathiazhagan as a college professor
 Yukta Mookhey special appearance as herself in the song "Yukta Mookhey"
 Ezhil special appearance in the song "Yukta Mookhey"
 Raju Sundaram special appearance in the song "Yukta Mookhey"

Production 
Ajith Kumar signed the film in early 2001 after he pulled out of Praveenkanth's commercial film Star. The producers had initially approached  Aishwarya Rai and then Simran to star, with their refusals leading to the casting of Jyothika. Miss World 1999, Yukta Mookhey was roped in to appear in an item number. Ajith gained mass image before the filming so producer Ravichandran expressed his doubts to Ezhil about carrying on with such a family oriented film with an action hero like Ajith in hand. But Ezhil was confident about Ajith's capabilities in pulling off varying roles.

Twin bungalows were erected in Prasad Studios for the film by art director Prabhakaran as the director could not locate a twin bungalow in the same compound. One house was built to feature antiques and the other with modern artifacts and computers. During the making of the film, Ajith was admitted to a Chennai city hospital for a surgery of his backbone causing a month's delay in the film's release.

Release 
The film released on 17 August 2001. A critic from The Hindu labeled it as "reasonably interesting", with Ajith's performance being praised as "natural and neat". The success of the film prompted Ezhil, Ajith and Jyothika to team up for a venture the following year with Raja (2002).

Awards 
It went on to win Tamil Nadu State Film Awards, securing second place in the Tamil Nadu State Film Award for Best Family Film and Ajith winning a special prize from the committee for his performance. It also saw awards for Sai for Best Costume Designer, Prabhakaran for Best Art Director, Kovai Sarala for Best Comedian and Vidyasagar for Best Music Director. Jyothika won  Cinema Express Award for Best Actress – Tamil, which was given to her by her co-star Ajith Kumar at Cinema Express Awards and was also nominated for Filmfare Award for Best Actress – Tamil for her portrayal of Chella.

Soundtrack 
The soundtrack was composed by Vidyasagar. The song "Kaadhal Vandhadhum" is set in Kapi raga. Vidyasagar reused the tune of his song "Pannendintiki Padukkonte", from his 2002 Telugu film Neetho, for this song. The soundtrack was well-received by both critics and the audience, and is regarded as one of Vidyasagar's best works in his career in Tamil cinema.

References 

Indian drama films
2001 films
2000s Tamil-language films
Films scored by Vidyasagar
Films directed by Ezhil
Indian family films